So This Is London may refer to:

 So This Is London (play), by Arthur Goodrich
 So This Is London (1930 film), an American film
 So This Is London (1939 film), a British film

See also
This Is London (disambiguation)